Corupá is a municipality of the state of Santa Catarina, located in the South Region of Brazil. It has approximately 16,000 inhabitants distributed over 407 km². It is located in the Valley Itapocu near Joinville. Its economy is based on the metallurgical industry and in the production of bananas.

See also
List of municipalities in Santa Catarina

References

Municipalities in Santa Catarina (state)